Men in Her Diary is a 1945 American comedy film. It stars Peggy Ryan and Jon Hall and was written by Lester Cole and directed by Charles Barton. It followed from the success of San Diego, I Love You.

Cast
Jon Hall
Peggy Ryan
Louise Allbritton

Production
It was filmed in February 1945.

Reception
The New York Times called it "as substantial as the froth on schooner of beer and just about as effective."

References

External links
 
 

1945 films
American comedy films
1945 comedy films
American black-and-white films
Films directed by Charles Barton
1940s American films